Annapurna Devi Mandir, also known as Annapurna Mata Mandir and Annapurna Mandir, is one of the most famous Hindu temples (Mandir) in the holy city of Varanasi. This temple has great religious importance in Hinduism and is dedicated to the goddess Annapurna. Annapurna is the Hindu goddess for nourishment and is a form of the goddess Parvati. The current Annapurna Mandir was constructed in the 18th century by Maratha Peshwa Bajirao I.

History
Annapurna Devi Mandir was constructed in 1729 AD by Maratha Peshwa Baji Rao.

Construction
The temple is constructed in Nagara architecture and has sanctum with large pillared porch, which houses a picture of goddess Annapurna. The temple also houses two icons of the goddess; one made of gold and other of brass. The brass icon is available for daily darshan (viewing & worship). The gold icon can be only seen once a year; on Annakut day.

Legend
In Hindu mythology, there are two popular beliefs behind the origin of this temple.

According to one belief, once the goddess Parvati closed all three eyes of her husband Shiva. Due to this, the entire world was filled with darkness. Parvati stole her fair complexion (Gauri form). She asked Shiva for his help to reacquire her Gauri form. Shiva  asked her to donate anna (food) in Varanasi. Hence, she took the form of Annapurna (the goddess of food) with a golden pot and ladle, and donated food in Varanasi.

According to another belief, once Shiva commented that the entire world (including food) is maya (illusion). Parvati, the goddess of food, got angry and decided to demonstrate the importance of food by making all the food on earth disappear. The world started to suffer due to hunger. Shiva finally came to Parvati and acknowledged the importance of food, begging for food at her door. Parvati became happy, offered food by her own hands to Shiva and then made a kitchen in Varanasi for her devotees.

Location

Annapurna Devi Mandir is situated in Visheshwarganj, Varanasi. It is situated 15 meters North-West of the famous Kashi Vishwanath Mandir, 350 meters West of Manikarnika Ghat, 5 kilometers South-East of Varanasi Junction railway station and 4.5 kilometers North-East of Banaras Hindu University.

There is one more Annapurna Mandir, which is in Indore city, state MP.

See also
 Hindu temples in Varanasi

References

18th-century Hindu temples
Hindu temples in Varanasi
18th-century establishments in India